Dhumakanal  is a village in the southern state of Karnataka, India. It is located in Indi taluk of Bijapur district, Karnataka. It is nearly 50 km from district headquarters, Bijapur.  Its one of the small villages near to Chadchan town; Dhumakanal lies 20 km by road south-east of Chadchan.

Demographics
In the 2001 India census, Dhumakanal had a population of 866, with 459 males and 407 females.

In the 2011 census Dhumakanal reported a population of 1,212.

Agriculture
Total land of village has more than 80% fertile and cropping area. The village mainly grows sugar cane, grape, maize, sorghum, pearl millet and small area of lemon, onion, turmeric etc. Irrigation is mainly based upon bore-wells and wells.

Education
In village there is a Government Higher Primary School currently working with 1st to 8th standard having more than 150 students. The whole village have more than 70% of literacy.

Trusts
In village there are some associations doing cultural, sports programmes and other activities.

References

External links
 http://Bijapur.nic.in/

Villages in Bijapur district, Karnataka